Marais-Vernier is a commune in the Eure department in Normandy in northern France. It is situated near the left bank of the Seine, at the edge of a wetland (the Marais Vernier) formed by an old branch of the Seine. The wetland was cut off from the river with dams in the 17th century. Part of it is used for farming (cattle, Camargue horses, Scottish Highland Cattle), part is a protected area which is important for birds like storks. The village itself is situated on the edge of the wetland.

Population

See also
Communes of the Eure department

References

External links

 Website of the Commune Le-Marais-Vernier
 Country Risle Estuaire
 Normandy Tourism - Official Site C.R.T. Normandy
 Federation Regional Tourist Country Home
 Normandy Tour
 Normandie Qualité Tourisme
 Comité Départemental du Tourisme de l'Eure
 Eure 27 Normandy
 Office de Tourisme d'Evreux

Communes of Eure